Lima Engine is a Ford Motor Company automobile engine plant located in Lima, Ohio, United States. The factory was opened in 1957 as the site of production of Ford's MEL V8 for the Edsel car. It subsequently produced six-cylinder engines (the 170/200/250 family), the 385-series 370/429/460 big block V8 engines, the 2.3/2.5 L HSC/HSO (Pushrod) four-cylinder engines for the Ford Tempo, Mercury Topaz, and Ford Taurus. The plant also produced the namesake Lima 2.0/2.3/2.5 L OHC four-cylinder used in Ford Pinto, Ford Fairmont,  Ford Mustang, Ford Thunderbird, Mercury Capri, Mercury Cougar, Ford Aerostar, Ford Ranger and 1993 onward Mazda B Series B2300/B2500 compact trucks.

Lima produces the 3.3 liter Duratec 33 3.5 liter Duratec 35 and the 3.7 liter Duratec 37, and added production of the 2.7 liter EcoBoost in 2015.  This factory also produces the 3.0 EcoBoost Engine.

Products:
 2.7 L 2.7 Ecoboost
 3.0 L 3.0 Ecoboost
 3.3 L Duratec 33 V6
 3.5 L Duratec 35 V6
 3.7 L Duratec 37 V6

References

External links
Ford Lima Engine Plant Fact Page
Ford Corporate Fact Sheet

See also
 List of Ford factories

Ford factories
Motor vehicle assembly plants in Ohio
Buildings and structures in Lima, Ohio